A whip is a stick, cord, or strap, usually with a stiff handle, used for striking or as an animal training aid.

Whip or whips or The Whip may also refer to:

People
 Whip (musician), American folk singer-songwriter
 Whip Jones (1909–2001), American ski industry pioneer

Arts, entertainment, and media

Fictional characters
 Whip (comics), several DC Comics characters
 Whip (King of Fighters), a video game character

Films
 The Whip (1917 film), 1917 American silent drama film directed by Maurice Tourneur
 The Whip (1928 film), 1928 American silent film drama directed by Charles Brabin
 The Whip (1939 film) (Spanish: El látigo), 1939 Mexican film directed by José Bohr

Music
 Whip (percussion), a percussion instrument
 The Whip (band), a British electro-rock band
 "Watch Me (Whip/Nae Nae)", a song by the American rapper Silentó

Other uses in arts, entertainment, and media
 Chicago Whip, a defunct early 20th century African-American newspaper often referred to as The Whip
 WHIP (AM), a radio station (1350 AM), Mooresville, North Carolina, US
 The Whip (play), a 1909 melodrama
 The Whip (ride), an amusement ride
 The Whip, a dance move popularised by Watch Me (Whip/Nae Nae)

Devices
 Whipping knot (or whipping), a binding around the end of a rope to prevent it from fraying
 Whip antenna, for radio waves
 WHIPS, Whiplash Injury Protection System in automobiles
 Whipstaff or whip, used to steer an old sailing vessel
Whip, slang for a car

Sports
 Walks plus hits per inning pitched (WHIP), a baseball statistic
 Washington Whips, a defunct US soccer/football team

Other uses
 Whip (politics), a political party discipline official
 Whip (tree), a slender unbranched shoot or plant
 Whip, to punish using a whip; see Flagellation
 Walnut Whip - a chocolate sweet

See also
 Whiplash (disambiguation)
 Whipped (disambiguation), or whipping
 Whippy (disambiguation), or Whippey
 WIP (disambiguation)
 WIPP (disambiguation)